Eddie Lowe (born January 1, 1960) is a former linebacker who played nine seasons in the Canadian Football League for the Saskatchewan Roughriders. Eddie Lowe is currently mayor of Phenix City, Alabama. He is the first black mayor of Phenix City.

Football career
Lowe played American football at Central High School in Phenix City. He attended the University of Tennessee at Chattanooga for a year before transferring to the University of Alabama, where he played for the football team as a walk-on. His older brother, Woodrow Lowe, also played at Central and Alabama, before going on to a career in the NFL. At 5' 10", Eddie was considered too small to play in the NFL, but he was recruited to play Canadian football with the Saskatchewan Roughriders. In 1989, he won the 77th Grey Cup with Saskatchewan and was named a CFL all-star. After the 1991 CFL season, he retired from football.

From 1992 until at least 2012, Lowe volunteered as an assistant to his brother Woodrow, coaching football at their alma mater of Central High School.

Political career
After retiring from football, Lowe began working as a banker. Prior to his election as mayor, Lowe served as president of the Phenix City Board of Education for a decade. In 2012, he was elected the first African-American mayor of Phenix City with 64 percent of the votes cast. He beat three opponents in the race, by a large enough margin to avoid a runoff election.

Personal life
Lowe is married with three children. His brothers include College Football Hall of Fame member Woodrow Lowe and James Lowe, Jr.

References

External links
Phenix City Mayor's Office
Eddie Lowe at Project Vote Smart

1960 births
African-American mayors in Alabama
African-American players of American football
African-American players of Canadian football
Alabama Crimson Tide football players
American athlete-politicians
American football linebackers
American players of Canadian football
Canadian football linebackers
Living people
Mayors of places in Alabama
Sportspeople from Columbus, Georgia
People from Phenix City, Alabama
Players of American football from Alabama
Players of American football from Georgia (U.S. state)
Saskatchewan Roughriders players
University of Tennessee at Chattanooga alumni
21st-century African-American people
20th-century African-American sportspeople